The 2010 Sobeys Slam was the third women's Grand Slam event of the 2010–11 curling season. It took place from November 11 to 14 at the John Brother MacDonald Stadium in New Glasgow, Nova Scotia.

It was the third ever Sobeys Slam event, and the first held since the event was put on hiatus during the 2009–10 season. The total prize pool of the event is CAD $60,000, and the winner of the event, Jennifer Jones, received CAD $12,000.

Teams

Results

A Event

B Event

C Event

Playoffs

External links
 Official site

Sobeys Slam, 2010
New Glasgow, Nova Scotia